Daleville Junior-Senior High School is a middle school and high school located in Daleville, Indiana.

See also
 List of high schools in Indiana
 Mid-Eastern Conference

References

External links

Public high schools in Indiana
Buildings and structures in Delaware County, Indiana